Santeri Kiiveri (born 18 March 2000) is a Finnish para alpine skier who competed at the 2018 and 2022 Winter Paralympics.

Career
Kiiveri represented Finland at the 2018 Winter Paralympics where he finished in fourth place in slalom, and sixth place in both the giant slalom and super combined.

He again represented Finland at the 2022 Winter Paralympics and won a gold medal in the giant slalom standing event, and a silver medal in the super combined standing event.

References 

Living people
2000 births
Finnish male alpine skiers
People from Lappeenranta
Alpine skiers at the 2018 Winter Paralympics
Alpine skiers at the 2022 Winter Paralympics
Medalists at the 2022 Winter Paralympics
Paralympic gold medalists for Finland
Paralympic silver medalists for Finland
Paralympic medalists in alpine skiing
Sportspeople from South Karelia
21st-century Finnish people